The 2011 Florida Gators baseball team represented the University of Florida in the sport of baseball during the 2011 college baseball season.  The Gators competed in Division I of the National Collegiate Athletic Association (NCAA) and the Eastern Division of the Southeastern Conference (SEC).  They played their home games at Alfred A. McKethan Stadium, on the university's Gainesville, Florida campus.  The team was coached by Kevin O'Sullivan, who was in his fourth season at Florida.

The Gators began the season looking to improve upon their appearance in the 2010 College World Series, where they were eliminated after their first two games.  After winning the SEC Tournament, the Gators advanced to the best-of-three 2011 College World Series Finals, where they were defeated by South Carolina in two games.

Roster

Schedule

! style="background:#FF4A00;color:white;"| Regular season
|- valign="top" 

|- bgcolor="#ddffdd"
| February 18 ||  || No. 3 || McKethan Stadium || 7–2 || Johnson (1–0) || Fontanez (0–1) || None || 5,157 || 1–0 || –
|- bgcolor="#ddffdd"
| February 19 || South Florida || No. 3 || McKethan Stadium || 4–1 || Randall (1–0) || Barbosa (0–1) || Toledo (1) || 4,994 || 2–0 || –
|- bgcolor="#ddffdd"
| February 20 || South Florida || No. 3 || McKethan Stadium || 5–0 || Whitson (1–0) || Gonzalez (0–1) || None || 3,852 || 3–0 || –
|- bgcolor="#ddffdd"
| February 22 || vs.  || No. 3 || Roger Dean StadiumJupiter, FL || 13–2 || DeSclafani (1–0) || Gonzaga (1–1) || None || 3,043 || 4–0 || –
|- bgcolor="#ddffdd"
| February 24 ||  || No. 3 || McKethan Stadium || 4–0 || Johnson (2–0) || Dennhardt (0–1) || Rodriguez (1) || 2,553 || 5–0 || –
|- bgcolor="#ddffdd"
| February 25 || Boston College || No. 3 || McKethan Stadium || 9–3 || Gibson (1–0) || Prohovich (0–1) || None || 4,222 || 6–0 || –
|- bgcolor="#ddffdd"
| February 27 || Boston College || No. 3 || McKethan Stadium || 7–2 || Whitson (2–0) || Leonard (1–1) || None || 4,213 || 7–0 || –
|-

|- bgcolor="#ffdddd"
| March 1 || vs. No. 6 Rivalry || No. 1 || Steinbrenner FieldTampa, FL || 3–5 || Sitz (2–0) || Toledo (0–1) || McGee (1) || 7,869 || 7–1 || –
|- bgcolor="#ddffdd"
| March 4 || Rivalry|| No. 1 || McKethan Stadium || 8–3 || Johnson (3–0) || Radziewski (1–1) || None || 4,587 || 8–1 || –
|- bgcolor="#ddffdd"
| March 5 || Miami (FL)Rivalry|| No. 1 || McKethan Stadium || 1–0 || DeSclafani (2–0) || Encinosa (0–2) || None || 4,851 || 9–1 || –
|- bgcolor="#ddffdd"
| March 6 || Miami (FL)Rivalry || No. 1 || McKethan Stadium || 5–3 || Toledo (1–1) || Whaley (2–1) || DeSclafani (1) || 4,114 || 10–1 || –
|- bgcolor="#ffdddd"
| March 8 ||  || No. 1 || McKethan Stadium || 0–7 || Adams (3–1) || Larson (0–1) || Murray (2) || 2,733 || 10–2 || –
|- bgcolor="#ddffdd"
| March 9 || at  || No. 1 || USF Baseball StadiumTampa, FL || 8–1 || Panteliodis (1–0) || Carlin (0–1) || None || 3,211 || 11–2 || –
|- bgcolor="#ddffdd"
| March 11 ||  || No. 1 || McKethan Stadium || 11–5 || Johnson (4–0) || Pickering (2–1) || None || 2,849 || 12–2 || –
|- bgcolor="#ddffdd"
| March 12 || Rhode Island || No. 1 || McKethan Stadium || 12–4 || Randall (2–0) || Graveline (2–2) || None || 3,087 || 13–2 || –
|- bgcolor="#ddffdd"
| March 13 || Rhode Island || No. 1 || McKethan Stadium || 8–6 || Whitson (3–0) || Peterson (0–3) || DeSclafani (2) || 3,058 || 14–2 || –
|- bgcolor="#ddffdd"
| March 15 || No. 4 Florida StateRivalry || No. 1 || McKethan Stadium || 5–410 || DeSclafani (3–0) || McGee (0–1) || None || 5,930 || 15–2 || –
|- bgcolor="#ddffdd"
| March 18 || at No. 7 LSU || No. 1 || Alex Box StadiumBaton Rouge, LA || 5–4 || Toledo (2–1) || Ott (0–1) || DeSclafani (3) || 12,076 || 16–2 || 1–0
|- bgcolor="#ddffdd"
| March 19 || at No. 7 LSU || No. 1 || Alex Box Stadium || 1–0 || Randall (3–0) || Gausman (2–1) || Maronde (1) || 11,703 || 17–2 || 2–0
|- bgcolor="#ddffdd"
| March 20 || at No. 7 LSU || No. 1 || Alex Box Stadium || 7–3 || Maddox (1–0) || Alsup (3–2) || None || 10,783 || 18–2 || 3–0
|- bgcolor="#ddffdd"
| March 22 ||  || No. 1 || McKethan Stadium || 22–5 || Rodriguez  (1–0) || Newman (0–2) || None || 3,008 || 19–2 || –
|- bgcolor="#ddffdd"
| March 23 || Winthrop || No. 1 || McKethan Stadium || 10–0 || Panteliodis (2–0) || Pierpont (0–2) || None || 2,847 || 20–2 || –
|- bgcolor="#ffdddd"
| March 25 || No. 4 South Carolina || No. 1 || McKethan Stadium || 2–9 || Roth (5–1) || Johnson (4–1) || None || 5,586 || 20–3 || 3–1
|- bgcolor="#ddffdd"
| March 26 || No. 4 South Carolina || No. 1 || McKethan Stadium || 2–1 || Randall (4–0) || Price (1–2) || None || 4,859 || 21–3 || 4–1
|- bgcolor="#ffdddd"
| March 27 || No. 4 South Carolina || No. 1 || McKethan Stadium || 3–4 || Price (2–2) || Toledo (2–2) || None || 4,393 || 21–4 || 4–2
|- bgcolor="#ffdddd"
| March 29 || vs. No. 7 Florida StateRivalry || No. 3 || Baseball GroundsJacksonville, FL || 2–5 || Sitz (3–1) || Rodriguez (1–1) || McGee (4) || 10,078 || 21–5 || –
|-

|- bgcolor="#ddffdd"
| April 1 ||  || No. 3 || McKethan Stadium || 3–0 || Randall (5–0) || Catapano (2–1) || None || 4,222 || 22–5 || 5–2
|- bgcolor="#ddffdd"
| April 2 || Tennessee || No. 3 || McKethan Stadium || 11–2 || DeSclafani (4–0) || Gruver (3–3) || None || 3,726 || 23–5 || 6–2
|- bgcolor="#ddffdd"
| April 3 || Tennessee || No. 3 || McKethan Stadium || 9–1 || Whitson (4–0) || Ramsey (0–1) || None || 4,121 || 24–5 || 7–2
|- bgcolor="#ffdddd"
| April 5 || UCF || No. 4 || McKethan Stadium || 3–4 || Hicks (2–1) || DeSclafani (4–1) || Richardson (1) || 3,049 || 24–6 || –
|- bgcolor="#ffdddd"
| April 8 || at Mississippi State || No. 4 || Dudy Noble FieldStarkville, MS || 5–7 || Stark (2–0) || Randall (5–1) || Reed (5) || 7,140 || 24–7 || 7–3
|- bgcolor="#ddffdd"
| April 9 || at Mississippi State || No. 4 || Dudy Noble Field || 18–0 || Johnson (5–1) || Stratton (4–3) || None || 11,201 || 25–7 || 8–3
|- bgcolor="#ddffdd"
| April 10 || at Mississippi State || No. 4 || Dudy Noble Field || 3–1 || Rodriguez (2–1) || Pollorena (3–1) || Maddox (1) || 6,453 || 26–7 || 9–3
|- bgcolor="#ffdddd"
| April 12 || at No. 8 Rivalry || No. 4 || Dick Howser StadiumTallahassee, FL || 1–3 || Scantling (2–0) || Panteliodis (2–1) || Bennett (2) || 6,357 || 26–8 || –
|- bgcolor="#ddffdd"
| April 15 || at  || No. 4 || Foley FieldAthens, GA || 5–4 || Randall (6–1) || Wood (4–4) || Rodriguez (2) || 2,432 || 27–8 || 10–3
|- bgcolor="#ffdddd"
| April 16 || at Georgia || No. 4 || Foley Field || 2–7 || Palazzone (6–1) || DeSclafani (4–2) || None || 3,011 || 27–9 || 10–4
|- bgcolor="#ddffdd"
| April 17 || at Georgia || No. 4 || Foley Field || 14–7 || Larson (1–1) || Dieterich (1–2) || None || 3,004 || 28–9 || 11–4
|- bgcolor="#ffdddd"
| April 20 || at UCF || No. 5 || Jay Bergman FieldOrlando, FL || 6–8 || Bradford (3–1) || Toledo (2–3) || None || 3,601 || 28–10 || –
|- bgcolor="#ddffdd"
| April 22 || Alabama || No. 5 || McKethan Stadium || 7–0 || Randall (7–1) || Kilcrease (5–3) || None || 4,206 || 29–10 || 12–4
|- bgcolor="#ddffdd"
| April 23 || Alabama || No. 5 || McKethan Stadium || 9–2 || Johnson (6–1) || Morgan (4–4) || None || 4,917 || 30–10 || 13–4
|- bgcolor="#ddffdd"
| April 24 || Alabama || No. 5 || McKethan Stadium || 2–1 || Whitson (5–0) || Smart (2–1) || Maronde (2) || 2,759 || 31–10 || 14–4
|- bgcolor="#ddffdd"
| April 29 ||  || No. 4 || McKethan Stadium || 9–3 || Randall (8–1) || Crouse (6–3) || None || 3,739 || 32–10 || 15–4
|- bgcolor="#ddffdd"
| April 30 || Ole Miss || No. 4 || McKethan Stadium || 8–1 || Johnson (7–1) || Goforth (3–6) || None || 4,305 || 33–10 || 16–4
|-

|- bgcolor="#ddffdd"
| May 1 ||  || No. 4 || McKethan Stadium || 7–2 || Whitson (6–0) || Wright (4–4) || None || 3,240 || 34–10 || 17–4
|- bgcolor="#ddffdd"
| May 3 ||  || No. 4 || McKethan Stadium || 11–0 || Panteliodis (3–1) || Gonzalez (0–3) || None || 2,582 || 35–10 || –
|- bgcolor="#ffdddd"
| May 5 || at No. 18  || No. 4 || Baum StadiumFayetteville, AR || 3–4 || Baxendale (7–1) || Randall (8–2) || None || 7,120 || 35–11 || 17–5
|- bgcolor="#ffdddd"
| May 6 || at No. 18 Arkansas || No. 4 || Baum Stadium || 3–5 || Fant (2–3) || Johnson (7–2) || Astin (1) || 9,286 || 35–12 || 17–6
|- bgcolor="#ddffdd"
| May 7 || at No. 18 Arkansas || No. 4 || Baum Stadium || 5–3 || Maddox (2–0) || Sanburn (2–4) || None || 9,862 || 36–12 || 18–6
|- bgcolor="#ddffdd"
| May 11 ||  || No. 5 || McKethan Stadium || 4–1 || Panteliodis (4–1) || Organ (4–1) || Campbell (1) || 2,928 || 37–12 || –
|- bgcolor="#ddffdd"
| May 13 || at No. 2 Vanderbilt || No. 5 || Hawkins FieldNashville, TN || 6–5 || DeSclafani (5–2) || Moore (4–2) || Maddox (2) || 3,541 || 38–12 || 19–6
|- bgcolor="#ffdddd"
| May 14 || at No. 2 Vanderbilt || No. 5 || Hawkins Field || 1–14 || Garvin (11–1) || Johnson (7–3) || None || 3,220 || 38–13 || 19–7
|- bgcolor="#ddffdd"
| May 15 || at No. 2 Vanderbilt || No. 5 || Hawkins Field || 6–312 || Toledo (3–3) || Armstrong (0–1) || None || 3,248 || 39–13 || 20–7
|- bgcolor="#ffdddd"
| May 17 ||  || No. 4 || McKethan Stadium || 2–11 || Tomshaw (7–3) || Panteliodis (4–2) || None || 2,987 || 39–14 || –
|- bgcolor="#ddffdd"
| May 19 ||  || No. 4 || McKethan Stadium || 9–6 || Johnson (8–3) || Rogers (3–7) || Maddox (3) || 3,164 || 40–14 || 21–7
|- bgcolor="#ffdddd"
| May 20 || Kentucky || No. 4 || McKethan Stadium || 1–14 || Meyer (7–5) || Randall (8–3) || None || 3,990 || 40–15 || 21–8
|- bgcolor="#ddffdd"
| May 21 || Kentucky || No. 4 || McKethan Stadium || 19–3 || Whitson (7–0) || Littrell (6–6) || None || 3,754 || 41–15 || 22–8
|-

|-
! style="background:#FF4A00;color:white;"| Post-season
|-

|- bgcolor="#ddffdd"
| May 25 || vs. Mississippi State || No. 5 || Regions ParkHoover, AL || 7–5 || Rodriguez (3–1) || Pollorena (6–5) || Maddox (4) || 8,392 || 42–15 || 1–0
|- bgcolor="#ddffdd"
| May 26 || vs. Alabama || No. 5 || Regions Park || 6–0 || Randall (9–3) || Morgan (5–6) || None || 7,123 || 43–15 || 2–0
|- bgcolor="#ffdddd"
| May 28 (1) || vs.  || No. 5 || Regions Park || 3–4 || Palazzone (10–4) || DeSclafani (5–3) || Maloof (18) || 7,205 || 43–16 || 2–1
|- bgcolor="#ddffdd"
| May 28 (2) || vs. Georgia || No. 5 || Regions Park || 3–2 || Toledo (4–3) || Swegman (1–1) || Maddox (5) || 1,486 || 44–16 || 3–1
|- bgcolor="#ddffdd"
| May 29 || vs. No. 2 Vanderbilt || No. 5 || Regions Park || 5–0 || Panteliodis (5–2) || Hill (4–1) || None || 7,845 || 45–16 || 4–1
|-

|- bgcolor="#ddffdd"
| June 3 ||  || No. 3 || McKethan Stadium || 17–3 || Whitson (8–0) || Soldinger (10–3) || None || 2,339 || 46–16 || 1–0
|- bgcolor="#ddffdd"
| June 4 || No. 23  || No. 3 || McKethan Stadium || 5–4 || Toledo (5–3) || Miller (2–2) || None || 3,565 || 47–16 || 2–0
|- bgcolor="#ddffdd"
| June 5 || No. 23 Miami (FL) || No. 3 || McKethan Stadium || 11–4 || Panteliodis (6–2) || Encinosa (5–6) || None || 2,937 || 48–16 || 3–0
|-

|- bgcolor="#ddffdd"
| June 10 || Mississippi State || No. 3 || McKethan Stadium || 11–1 || Randall (10–3) || Mitchell (6–2) || None || 2,446 || 49–16 || 1–0
|- bgcolor="#ffdddd"
| June 11 || Mississippi State || No. 3 || McKethan Stadium || 3–4 || Reed (1–1) || Rodriguez (3–2) || None || 4,223 || 49–17 || 1–1
|- bgcolor="#ddffdd"
| June 12 || Mississippi State || No. 3 || McKethan Stadium || 8–6 || Toledo || Reed (1–2) || None || 3,812 || 50–17 || 2–1
|-

|- bgcolor="#ddffdd"
| June 18 || vs. No. 5 Texas || No. 3 || TD Ameritrade ParkOmaha, NE || 8–4 || Randall (11–3) || Jungmann (13–3) || Maronde (3) || 25,521 || 51–17 || 1–0
|- bgcolor="#ddffdd"
| June 21 || vs. No. 2 Vanderbilt || No. 3 || TD Ameritrade Park || 3–1 || Rodriguez (4–2) || Garvin (13–2) || None || 20,182 || 52–17 || 2–0
|- bgcolor="#ddffdd"
| June 24 || vs. No. 2 Vanderbilt || No. 3 || TD Ameritrade Park || 6–4 || Maddox (3–0) || Gray (12–4) || None || 20,087 || 53–17 || 3–0
|-
! colspan=10|Finals || width="5%" | Record
|- bgcolor="#ffdddd"
| June 27 || vs. No. 4 South Carolina || No. 3 || TD Ameritrade Park || 1–211 || Taylor (8–1) || Maronde (0–1) || Price (19) || 25,851 || 53–18 || 0–1
|- bgcolor="#ffdddd"
| June 28 || vs. No. 4 South Carolina || No. 3 || TD Ameritrade Park || 2–5 || Roth (14–3) || Whitson (8–1) || Price (20) || 26,721 || 53–19 || 0–2
|-

| Rankings from USA Today/ESPN Coaches' Poll. All times Eastern. Retrieved from FloridaGators.com

Rankings

NR = Not Ranked

Awards and honors

See also
Florida Gators
List of Florida Gators baseball players

References

External links
 Gator Baseball official website

Florida Gators baseball seasons
Florida Gators baseball team
Florida Gators
College World Series seasons
Southeastern Conference baseball champion seasons
Florida